Yu Province may refer to the following ancient Chinese provinces:
 Yuzhou (ancient China), an ancient Chinese province
 Yuchow/Yu Province, the Chinese Postal Map Romanisation spelling for the ancient Chinese province of Youzhou
 Yu (豫) is the short name for modern Henan province